Corrèze is a railway station in Saint-Priest-de-Gimel, Nouvelle-Aquitaine, France. The station is located on the Tulle–Meymac railway line. The station is served by the TER Nouvelle-Aquitaine regional service operated by the SNCF.

Train services

The station is served by regional trains towards Bordeaux, Brive-la-Gaillarde and Ussel.

References

Railway stations in Corrèze